Bab El Fellah is one of the gates of the medina of Tunis.

Also called "Door of the Breach", it is located on the second enclosure of the southern suburbs of Tunis. Built around 1350, it plays an important economic role because its situation near the agricultural plain and on the roads of Zaghouan and Kairouan.

According to an ancient tradition, beside this door, there was a wide breach which allowed the flight of the Tunisians during the battle of Tunis in 1535.

References

External links

Fellah